The blue-cheeked flowerpecker or red-chested flowerpecker (Dicaeum maugei) is a species of bird in the family Dicaeidae. It is found on the Lesser Sundas (namely Timor island). Its natural habitats are subtropical or tropical moist lowland forest and subtropical or tropical moist montane forest.

References

blue-cheeked flowerpecker
Birds of the Lesser Sunda Islands
Birds of Timor
blue-cheeked flowerpecker
Taxonomy articles created by Polbot